The Căiuți is a right tributary of the river Trotuș in Romania. It discharges into the Trotuș in the village Căiuți.

References

Rivers of Romania
Rivers of Bacău County